The Ministry of Manpower (Indonesian: Kementerian Ketenagakerjaan) of the Republic of Indonesia is a government ministry responsible for the workers and labour laws of Indonesia. The minister is currently Ida Fauziyah since 23 October 2019.

History 
The Ministry of Manpower was founded in 1947, two years after independence, after sections of the Ministry of Social Affairs were separated in accordance with Government Regulation 3 signed on July 27 that year to form the ministry, which is responsible for the implementation of state policies on the labor sector. The first minister was S. K. Trimurti, who reported to Prime Minister Amir Sjarifuddin, who was faced with the huge job of preparing national policies and programs to help the labor force cope with the then ongoing National Revolution.

Organization 

The Ministry of Manpower is a full ministry of the Cabinet of the Republic and is organized in the following manner as other ministries:

 Office of the Deputy Minister
 Secretariat General for Manpower
 Directorates General
 Directorate General of Training and Productivity Development
 Directorate General of Development of Workforce Placement and Expansion of Job Opportunities
 Directorate General of Industrial Relations Development and Workers' Social Security 
 Directorate General of Labor Inspection Development and Occupational Safety and Health
 Inspectorate General 
 Employment Planning and Development Center
 Expert Staff Offices of the Ministry
 International Labor Cooperation
 Public Policies on Labor
 Economic Affairs and Human Resources
 Inter-Institutional Relations

Ministers

References

External links

Government ministries of Indonesia